Clarence Cyril Walton (June 22, 1915 – April 13, 2004) was the 10th president of The Catholic University of America and the first layman to hold the position.  He was also the first to hold the title 'president' and not 'rector.'

Early life 
Clarence Walton was born in Scranton, Pennsylvania, to Leo and Mary Walton. His background has been described as working-class, his father worked for Delaware, Lackawanna and Western Railroad, and was of Irish American origin. In World War II he served in the United States Navy. He married Betty Kennedy in 1943 and with her had two children. His wife had also served during the war with WAVES.

Education and career 
He earned his bachelor's degree from the University of Scranton and a Master's from Syracuse University. His doctorate came from The Catholic University of America where he later became President. On his becoming President a student from Columbia University- where he served with distinction as Dean of the School of General Studies stated of him "He's a really good guy in the American tradition. He comes on as almost goody-goody,at the same time he's a very clever, shrewd diplomat. He's genuinely liberally progressive." He also had a strong interest in business ethics and later taught it at Villanova University. Despite being called "liberally progressive" in 1969, and having critiqued capitalism, he has been described as a devout Catholic thus banned Ti-Grace Atkinson from speaking at the University because of her views on the Blessed Virgin Mary. However this ban was overturned in court and he attended or observed the event. Due to this Patricia Buckley Bozell, who while listening to Atkinson ran to the podium to slap her for ridiculing the Virgin Birth then left, felt Walton to ultimately be weak and "sniveling" for following the court order and knowingly attending.

References

Copy of Clarence C. Walton's obituary

American people of Irish descent
People from Scranton, Pennsylvania
University of Scranton alumni
Syracuse University alumni
Presidents of the Catholic University of America
Villanova University faculty
1915 births
2004 deaths
20th-century American academics